Albert Johansson (born 4 January 2001) is a Swedish professional ice hockey defenceman currently playing for the Grand Rapids Griffins of the American Hockey League (AHL) as a prospect to the Detroit Red Wings of the National Hockey League (NHL).

Playing career
He was drafted 60th overall by the Detroit Red Wings in the 2019 NHL Entry Draft. On 6 June 2020, Johansson was signed to a three-year, entry-level contract with the Red Wings. He was returned on loan by the Red Wings to continue his Swedish Hockey League (SHL) career with Färjestad BK for the 2021–22 season on 14 June 2021.

Career statistics

Regular season and playoffs

International

Awards and honors

References

External links
 

2001 births
Living people
Detroit Red Wings draft picks
Färjestad BK players
Grand Rapids Griffins players
Sportspeople from Karlstad
Swedish ice hockey defencemen